Octávio Barbosa (April 29, 1907 – January 31, 1997) was a Brazilian geologist.

Barbosa was born in Ituverava, where he lived with his parents on a farm until 13 years old. He learned to read at the age of five, and had his secondary education at schools in Ribeirão Preto. Octávio Barbosa graduated from the Universidade Federal de Ouro Preto (UFOP) in civil engineering and Mining.

He married Beatriz de Lima Vieira, on April 19, 1933, in Belo Horizonte, MG, Brazil. His second wife, Vera Rita de Castro Dias, geographer, formed by the USP, collaborated on many of the geomorphological works. He has a son and four grandchildren. From his first marriage, until August 1954, had five children, 10 grandchildren and six great-grandchildren.

At 1932, he joined the Polytechnic School of São Paulo, where he taught for 16 years. With 48 years went to work for Prospec in Petropolis, where he developed consulting activities. In 1977, he joined the CPRM, currently  Geological Survey of Brazil.

It was a professional versatility. He has published over 200 scientific papers and trained hundreds of engineers and geologists. Octávio Barbosa attended the first board of Brazilian Geological Society, serving as vice president alongside Luciano Jacques de Moraes. He made many works of field geology and mineral prospecting and had appreciation for the indigenous terms, which you also were useful in physiographic descriptions and interpretations in Brazil.

Octávio Barbosa was in the Geological Survey, for six years, research assistant to Luciano Jacques de Moraes, with whom he published some works in co-authorship. Very young, he was appointed Director of Current Development Division of Mineral Production, where he remained until 1940. In those years he studied the phonolite of Lages, Santa Catarina (1933) described the rocks and geology of the former Federal District, covering the Rio de Janeiro. Studied deposits of nickel (1935), iron (especially in Santa Catarina) and manganese, and devoted some time to studies on groundwater, particularly in Minas Gerais (1938–1940), was also interested by the pre-Devonian formations ( 1936). Published in 1938, work on deposits of aquamarine, bismuth and tantalum. Wrote about gold in general, and particularly on the Gold Caeté (1939) and outlined preliminary ideas about the geology of the Reconcavo Baiano, also in 1939.

In 1938 he criticized, in a famous controversy in the Brazilian Academy of Sciences, the theory of protognaisse "Alberto Ribeiro Lamego. His versatility and his scientific curiosity, excited by the issues of greatest interest to Brazil, are witnessed by publication of the decade running from 1930 to 1940. In 1940 published a work on hygiene of mines that forerun the Environmental Geology, indicates unfavorable conditions prevailing at the Morro Velho Mine, anticipating the current concepts. That same year he studied the glacial striations of Permo-Carboniferous Paraná Basin. In 1940 he was invited to occupy the Chair of geology of Polytechnic School of USP. He stayed 16 years as a Professor in this University. Published in 1949, co-authored with his assistant, Fernando Flávio Marques de Almeida, work on the Tubarão and Ribeira. Studied, from 1941 to 1943, the mine magnesite of Serra das Éguas, in the Bahia. He was a consultant Perus Cement Factory, where he supervised the mining of limestone, clay, and also of magnesite. In 1953 he specialized in granitization. In 1954 he wrote a note on geology for tunnels and dams. In 1956 he left the Polytechnic School of São Paulo and was hired as a consultant for the company Prospec in Petrópolis. Then had the opportunity to attend various congresses and symposia, national and international. Participated in various projects of geological mapping and economic geology. The first work in which he engaged was the "Project Araguaia" photogeological survey, between the rivers Tocantins, Araguaia and Xingu.

The literature reports studies on the coal basin of the Tocantins and descriptions of volcanic events in Brazil, Peru and Mexico (both 1957). That same year he published an essay on the chimney alkaline and carbonatite. His interest in this subject comes from 1934 and 1936, commented on the chimney of Poços de Caldas (and also in 1948). He published several papers on geomorphology, which is in the field, one of their first looks. The versatility of curious Octávio Barbosa is that, from 1952 to 1958, he published some work on paleobotany, setting the age of Gondwana floras and weaving observations (in 1957) on the Paratoxopitys Americana, a fossil wood of Irati Formation. Had the opportunity to spend some time on his passion: the diamonds. Since 1938, when he studied the diamond "Minas Gerais", by Coromandel, it remained latent interest to academics, studying, still in Prospec, diamonds in western Minas Gerais. In 1977, after 21 years of stay in Prospec, has joined the cadre of the CPRM, where it remained, as consultant.

He made geological surveys and mineral registry panel to the west of São Francisco River and eastern Tocantins River. Surveys conducted in Goiás Minas Gerais and current Distrito Federal. Studied the tin ores of Rio Palma and the nickel Barro Alto, where calculating 120 million tons of ore weathering. Studied deposits of gold in the basin of the Ribeira south of São Paulo. He researched the covers of the Brazilian Northeast. In recent years engaged in research in platinum in the states of Pernambuco Bahia, São Paulo Resources and Goiás.

Octávio Barbosa received numerous accolades, awards and honors. In 1974 he received the Medal of Merit Mineral. The Brazilian Geological Society (SBG) in 1968, awarded him the highest honor of geologists from Brazil, the Gold Medal "José Bonifácio." He stated several times that the professional to feel happy to follow their desires and meet up with their aspirations and their work. Feeling comfortable in improvisations Mandatory field work and having used all means of transport that can be imagined as jeep, airplane, little planes, helicopter, mule, truck, boat and how many types of locomotion may exist, Octávio Barbosa always preached to the young: "Love life of the field and like to travel, by any possible means of locomotion." His love of geology made him declare often that will live with a hammer in his hand until the last day of his life.

" Much remains to be done, geology and mining in Brazil. Although the current labor market and demand for services to geology are still very scarce, I believe (says Octávio Barbosa) that this situation will change because in large countries such as South Africa, Canada, the United States, Russia and others, where the geology was well developed, still discover new things. In spite of all that is known, is a world to discover . The Amazon, for example, which is unknown, is a true Canadian. Therefore, I believe there will, therefore, an incentive for the present, even the new geologists, come here to toil in their specialties"' "– Octávio Barbosa.

Octávio Barbosa died on January 31, 1997, in Petrópolis, RJ. He left a vast legacy of geological knowledge recorded in hundreds of papers published as reports, books and journal articles which are incorporated in the Library of CPRM, Geological Survey of Brazil in Rio de Janeiro. The Library was named Library Octávio Barbosa whose works are available for free access. It incorporates a specialized collection in Geosciences, listing papers, books, national and international journals, and technical reports, maps, aerial photographs and various photocartographic documents that are available to the community. In CPRM, are also some precious field notebooks written by Octávio Barbosa during the 1930s and 1950s, recording their insights, adventures, knowledge and important passage for the Geology of Brazil.

Sources: texts summarized page of CPRM and the homage done by geologist Professor J. R de Andrade Ramos to eminent Brazilian geologist Octávio Barbosa, on the occasion of the Third Symposium on Geology of the Southeast (1993), Rio de Janeiro-RJ, Brazil.

 References 

 External links 
 Home Library "Octávio Barbosa"'' CPRM Geological Survey of Brazil

20th-century Brazilian geologists
1997 deaths
1907 births
People from Ituverava